James Arthur "Bull" Sorey (September 5, 1936 – August 12, 2008) was an American football defensive tackle who played three seasons with the Buffalo Bills of the American Football League. He was drafted by the Chicago Bears in the fourteenth round of the 1960 NFL Draft. He was also drafted by the Buffalo Bills in the 1960 AFL Draft. Sorey played college football at Texas Southern University.

Professional career
He was selected by the Chicago Bears with the 165th pick of the 1960 NFL Draft. He was selected by the Buffalo Bills in the 1960 AFL Draft and played in 42 games for the team from 1960 to 1962.

Coaching career
Sorey was named head coach of the Texas Southern Tigers in December 1978 and served in that capacity from 1979 to 1980, recording a 5–17 record.

Head coaching record

References

External links
 
 Just Sports Stats

1936 births
2008 deaths
American football defensive tackles
American Football League players
Buffalo Bills players
Mississippi Valley State Delta Devils football coaches
Texas Southern Tigers football coaches
Texas Southern Tigers football players
People from Marianna, Florida
Players of American football from Florida
African-American coaches of American football
African-American players of American football
20th-century African-American sportspeople
21st-century African-American people